Greenville County is located in the state of South Carolina, in the United States. As of the 2020 census, the population was 525,534, making it the most populous county in the state. Its county seat is Greenville. The county is also home to the Greenville County School District, the largest school system in South Carolina.  County government is headquartered at Greenville County Square.

Greenville County is the most populous county in Upstate South Carolina, as well as the state. It is the central county of the Greenville-Anderson, SC metropolitan statistical area, which in turn is part of the Greenville-Spartanburg-Anderson combined statistical area.

History

18th century
In 1786, due to population growth in Ninety-Six District and the victory of the American Whigs over the British and their colonial Tory and Cherokee allies, the state legislature formed Greenville County (originally spelled Greeneville), named for General Nathanael Greene, the hero of the American southern campaign. Greenville County was the first county created in the overarching Ninety-Six District, but from 1791 to 1798, both neighboring Pendleton County (the other county formed from Cherokee territory in northwestern Ninety-Six District) and it were part of the new overarching Washington District. From 1798 to 1800, it was part of the short-lived overarching Pendleton District. In 1798, all counties were reidentified as "elective districts" to be effective on 1 January 1800; thereafter, the Greenville District was no longer part of Pendleton District. In 1868, the districts were converted back to counties.

Geography

State and local protected areas 
 Blue Wall Preserve
 Caesars Head State Park
 Cedar Falls Park
 Chestnut Ridge Heritage Preserve and Wildlife Management Area
 Conestee Nature Preserve
 J. Verne Smith Park (Lake Robinson)
 Jones Gap State Park
 Mountain Bridge Wilderness Area
 Paris Mountain State Park
 Pleasant Valley Park

Adjacent counties

 Henderson County, North Carolina – north
 Polk County, North Carolina – northeast
 Spartanburg County – east
 Laurens County – southeast
 Abbeville County – south
 Anderson County – southwest
 Pickens County – west
 Transylvania County, North Carolina – northwest

Major water bodies 
 Enoree River
 North Saluda River
 Saluda River
 South Saluda River

Major highways

Major infrastructure 
 Donaldson Center Airport
 Greenville–Spartanburg International Airport (mostly in Spartanburg County)
 Greenville Station (Amtrak)

Demographics

2020 census

As of the 2020 United States census, 525,534 people, 199,551 households, and 130,296 families were residing in the county.

2010 census
As of the 2010 United States Census, 451,225 people, 176,531 households, and 119,362 families were residing in the county. The racial makeup of the county was 73.8% White, 18.1% African American, 2.0% Asian, 0.3% American Indian, 0.1% Pacific Islander, 3.9% from other races, and 1.9% from two or more races. Those of Hispanic or Latino origin made up 8.1% of the population. In terms of ancestry, 13.0% were American, 11.6% were German, 10.9% were English, and 10.7% were Irish.

Of the 176,531 households, 33.7% had children under 18 living with them, 49.7% were married couples living together, 13.5% had a female householder with no husband present, 32.4% were not families, and 27.0% were made up of individuals. The average household size was 2.49, and the average family size was 3.03. The median age was 37.2 years.

The median income for a household in the county was $46,830 and for a family was $59,043. Males had a median income of $45,752 versus $33,429 for females. The per capita income for the county was $25,931. About 10.8% of families and 14.1% of the population were below the poverty line, including 20.0% of those under age 18 and 9.1% of those age 65 or over.

Ancestry
As of 2016, the largest self-reported ancestry groups in Greenville County were:

Government and politics
Greenville County is governed by a 12-member county council. The current county administrator is Joseph Kernell, whom the council appointed in January 2004 after voting in late 2003 to hire him. Kernell was previously the county administrator for St. Charles County, Missouri. Other staff hired by the council include a clerk and an attorney.

Council members are elected by voters in each of the 12 state legislative districts (17–28) within the county and serve staggered four-year terms.

From the latter half of the 20th century onward, Greenville County has voted overwhelmingly Republican in presidential elections. It has gone Republican in every presidential election since 1960, and in all but one election since 1952. Even Jimmy Carter of neighboring Georgia failed to win the county in 1976 despite winning the state. To date, Carter's two runs are the last times that a Democrat has managed even 40% of the county's vote, and one of only two official Democratic candidates to do so since 1948. In 2020, Joe Biden became the first Democrat to obtain over 100,000 votes in the county, and Donald Trump's 18.2% margin of victory was the lowest for any Republican since 1980. Biden came within 320 votes of being only the second Democrat in 72 years to win 40% of the county's vote.

The county also rejects Democrats at the state level; it was one of the first areas of the state where Republicans were able to break the long Democratic monopoly on state and local offices.

Law enforcement 
When Greenville County was formed in 1786, it was served by the sheriff of the Ninety Six District. A Washington District, including Greenville and Pendleton Counties, existed from 1791 to 1799. (Pendleton was split in 1826 into Pickens and Anderson Counties.) One of the district's first sheriffs, Revolutionary War hero Robert Maxwell, served from 1795 to 1797, when he was killed in an ambush.

Sheriffs in South Carolina were originally elected by the state legislature. In 1808, a law was enacted to provide for the election of the sheriff directly by the citizens of the county, rather than by politicians. This method of election was placed into the South Carolina State Constitution in 1868 and the Office of Sheriff in Greenville County began.

In 2017, Sheriff Will Lewis was suspended by Governor Henry McMaster for misconduct, perjury, and obstruction of justice. These charges came out of a sexual assault lawsuit filed by Lewis' female assistant. Although the sheriff said the relationship was consensual, he settled the claim for an undisclosed sum. Lewis was found guilty in 2019 and sentenced to a year of prison, although he did not begin his sentence until October 2021.

, the sheriff of Greenville County is Hobart Lewis. The sheriff's office includes five divisions: Administrative Services, Community Services, Uniform Patrol, Criminal Investigations, and Judicial Services.

Economy
CommunityWorks Federal Credit Union was chartered in 2014 to serve the residents of Greenville County. It is sponsored by CommunityWorks, Inc., a nonprofit community-development financial institution, and receives assistance from the United Way of Greenville County and the Hollingsworth Fund.

Education
School districts include:
 Anderson School District 2
 Greenville County School District
 Spartanburg County School District 1
 Charter schools – Greenville County has numerous public charter schools that are free to state residents.

Healthcare
The Greenville Memorial Hospital was formerly operated by the municipal government, with Greenville Health System being the operating authority. In 2016, Prisma Health began leasing the hospital and directly operating. The GHA is the portion of the Greenville Health System that still existed after the hospital transitioned into being operated by Prisma. The Greenville Health Authority (GHA) is the owner of the hospital facilities operated by Prisma. Members of the South Carolina Legislature select a majority of the seats of the board of directors of the GHA.

Communities
In the past, Greenville County was partitioned into townships. Their former names and boundaries were used for United States census counting purposes and census documentation through 1960, after which census counting divisions were used. The 2010 Census lists six cities and 16 census designated places that are fully or partially within Greenville County.

Cities
 Fountain Inn (partly in Laurens County)
 Greenville (county seat and largest city)
 Greer (partly in Spartanburg County)
 Mauldin
 Simpsonville
 Travelers Rest

Census-designated places

 Berea
 Caesars Head
 City View
 Conestee
 Dunean
 Five Forks
 Gantt
 Golden Grove
 Judson
 Parker
 Piedmont (partly in Anderson County)
 Sans Souci
 Slater-Marietta
 Taylors
 The Cliffs Valley
 Tigerville
 Wade Hampton
 Ware Place
 Welcome

Other unincorporated communities
 Altamont
 Batesville
 Cleveland
 Gowensville

See also
 List of counties in South Carolina
 National Register of Historic Places listings in Greenville County, South Carolina
 South Carolina State Parks

References

External links

 
 
 Greenville County History and Images

 
1786 establishments in South Carolina
Populated places established in 1786
Upstate South Carolina
Counties of Appalachia